Hopea apiculata is a species of plant in the family Dipterocarpaceae. It is found in Malaysia, Myanmar, and Thailand.

References

apiculata
Critically endangered plants
Taxonomy articles created by Polbot